Amaxia pardalis is a moth of the family Erebidae. It was described by Francis Walker in 1855 and is the type species of the genus Amaxia. It is found in Brazil, Suriname, Costa Rica and Mexico.

Subspecies
Amaxia pardalis pardalis
Amaxia pardalis osmophora Hampson, 1901 (Costa Rica)
Amaxia pardalis parva Rothschild, 1909 (Surinam, Brazil)

References

Moths described in 1855
Amaxia
Moths of North America
Moths of South America